Stanley E. Rabjohn (October 6, 1914 – July 21, 2001) was an American film editor.

Selected filmography (as editor)
 The Bullfighters (1945)
 Behind Green Lights (1946)
 Fighter Attack (1953)
 Paris Encounter (1959)
 Hang the Men High (1960)
 X-15 (1961)
 The Deadly Companions (1961)
 The Psycho Lover (1970)
 Where Does It Hurt? (1971)

References

External links 

 

1914 births
2001 deaths
American film editors